Mihran Azaryan (1876 in Izmit, Ottoman Empire – 1952 in Istanbul, Turkey) was an Ottoman Armenian and Turkish architect who is best known for having designed and constructed the Büyükada Pier and possibly the Izmit Clock Tower.

He was the son of Bedros Azaryan, an Ottoman Armenian, who was a graduate of the Imperial School of Military Engineering in Hasköy, Constantinople. Mihran Azaryan graduated from Sanayi-i Nefise Mekteb-i Âlisi (today Mimar Sinan Fine Arts University).  His military service was in Istanbul between 1914-1918 and it was during this period that he realized the Büyükada Pier. After this time in Istanbul, he lived and worked in Izmit for a while and then moved to Samsun where he continued his profession. In 1935 he returned to Istanbul and continued working as an architect. Azaryan died in Istanbul, in 1952.

References

People from İzmit
Ethnic Armenian architects
Armenians from the Ottoman Empire
1876 births
1952 deaths
Turkish architects
Architects from the Ottoman Empire